Greg Frady (born December 2, 1962) is an American college baseball coach. He was most recently the head coach of the Georgia State Panthers baseball team since the start of the 2007 season until the end of the 2019 season. He also served as general manager of the German National team. Frady was the head coach at North Florida Community College from 1990–1996.  Before serving as North Florida Community College head coach, Frady played for Troy from 1984–1987.  He began his coaching career as a graduate assistant at Columbus State University. From 1997–2003, he served as an assistant at Central Florida before being hired as an assistant coach at Georgia State in 2004. He became general manager for the German national team in 2004 and head coach at Georgia State in 2007. In July, 2020, he was named the first Head Coach of the Nanaimo NightOwls of the West Coast League, signed to a five year contract to lead the team at historic Serauxmen Stadium. The 2021 season, to be the debut of the NightOwls with Frady at the helm, was cancelled due to the pandemic.

German national team
Since becoming manager for the German national baseball team, the team has gone from having to qualify to enter tournaments to being ranked 17th in the world rankings. While coaching in Germany, Frady has recruited players from the nation to play for the Georgia State Panthers team. Frady was hired by the team in 2004, leading them through the 2004 European Championships.

Coaching career

North Florida Community College
After completing his graduate program at Columbus State University, Frady was hired by North Florida Community College to serve as head coach where he racked up a record of 187-112. During his time at NFCC, he served as Rotary Club president in Madison, Florida.

Georgia State
Frady began his career at Georgia State in 2004, working as an associate coach under former head coach Mike Hurst. After Hurst's retirement, Frady was promoted to head coach where he racked up a record of 228-173-1 over his first 7 years. This represents the second most wins in Georgia State History, shadowed only by Mike Hurst's 293 wins. During his tenure, the Panthers won their first conference tournament championship, taking them to the NCAA regional tournament for the first time ever. The 39 wins made that season also represented the record for most wins in a season. During the 2010 season, his Panthers led the nation in runs per game, and during the 2011 season, the Panthers made a school-record ERA.

Head coaching record
Below is a table of Frady's yearly records as an NCAA head baseball coach.

References

1962 births
Living people
Columbus State Cougars baseball coaches
Georgia State Panthers baseball coaches
Columbus State University alumni
North Florida Sentinels baseball coaches
Troy Trojans baseball players
UCF Knights baseball coaches
People from Gilmer County, Georgia